The President of the Republic of Moldova is the head of state of Moldova. The current president is Maia Sandu, who assumed office on 24 December 2020.

Duties and functions 
The office of the presidency in Moldova is largely ceremonial, with most of the formal political power exercised by parliament and the prime minister. However, because the president represents Moldova internationally, they have sway over the country's relationships with other countries. In addition, the president can influence public policy by using their high profile to initiate and participate in public discourse.

A collection of organizational bodies collectively known as the Presidential Administration, whose members are appointed by the president, serves as the communication service between the government and the presidency. One office of the Administration, the Supreme Security Council, advises the president on foreign policy.

Election
The president is elected in a two-round direct election, with a runoff taking place between the top two finishers if no candidate receives a majority in the first round. This system was put in place when the constitution of Moldova was adopted in 1994.

In 2000, the Constitution was amended changing the process to an indirect election by the Parliament of Moldova, with a supermajority of 61 votes required. On March 4, 2016, the Constitutional Court ruled that the amendment was unconstitutional and Moldova consequently returned to electing the president via popular vote.

One presidential term lasts for four years; presidents are limited to two terms. Before the 2000 amendments, the presidential term lasted for five years.

Constitutional position
According to the Article 77 of the Constitution of Moldova (1994), the president of Moldova is the head of the state and represents the state and is the guarantor of national sovereignty, independence, and the unity and territorial integrity of the nation.

Acting president
The acting president of Moldova  is a person who fulfils the duties of the president of Moldova when cases of incapacity and vacancy occur. It is a temporary post provided by the Constitution of Moldova.

According to Article 91 of the Constitution of Moldova (1994):

Suspension from office
According to Article 89 of the Constitution of Moldova (1994): 
(1) In the event where the president of the Republic of Moldova commits grave offenses infringing upon constitutional provisions, he or she may be suspended from office by Parliament if two-thirds of the members cast their vote in support of suspension. 
(2) The motion requesting the suspension from office must be initiated by at least one third of the members, and it must be brought to the knowledge of the President without delay. The President may give explanations on the actions for which he or she is being censured before parliament.
(3) If the motion requesting suspension from office meets with approval, a national referendum shall be organized within 30 days for removing the President from office.

Vacancy
According to Article 90 of the Constitution of Moldova (1994): 
(1) The office of the President of the Republic of Moldova may become vacant in consequence of expiry of the presidential mandate, resignation from office, removal from office, definite impossibility of executing his duties, or death.
(2) The request to remove the President of the Republic of Moldova from office will be brought forward in Parliament, which will pass a decision on that request. 
(3) Within 3 months from the date when the presidential office was announced as vacant elections for a new president will be held in accordance with the law.

Standard 

The presidential standard consists of the Coat of Arms of Moldova in front of a purple background and a border composed of squares of 1/9 in the national colors of the republic. The regulations of the Standard of the President is approved by the decree of the President with the opinion of the National Heraldic Commission. The original of the Standard of the President is handed over to the President at the inauguration ceremony and is kept in their office. Duplicates and copies of the standard are displayed at the Presidential Palace or at other presidential residences while they are on these premises.

Band and music
The official march of the presidency is the Marș de Întîmpinare «La Mulți ani» (Slow March «To many years»), which is used during the arrival of the president at special occasions, similarly to Hail to the Chief for the President of the United States. The Presidential Band of the Republic of Moldova is the main military band of the Armed Forces of the Republic of Moldova and specifically serves the president during all functions of state. The band performs at welcome ceremonies of foreign officials on state visits, military parades, and the accreditation of ambassadors.

Office of the President 

 Andrei Spînu – Secretary General
 Sergiu Cotorobai – Deputy Secretary General
 Ecaterina Casinge – Chief of Staff
 Veaceslav Negruța – Economic Advisor
 Cristina Gherasimov – Foreign Policy and European Integration Advisor
 Stella Jantuan – Advisor on Political Issues, Relations with Public Authorities and CIvil Society
 Iuliana Cantaragiu – Environmental Protection and Climate Change Advisor
 Veronica Bradăuțanu – Judicial Advisor
 Valentina Chicu – Education and Research Advisor
 Angela Brașoveanu Erizanu – Culture Advisor
 Elena Druță – Diaspora Relations Advisor
 Irina Gotișan-Sotnic – Press Secretary and Public Communication Advisor

List of presidents of Moldova

Moldavian Democratic Republic (1917–1918)

 Party

Moldavian Soviet Socialist Republic (1940–1991)

Chairmen of the Presidium of the Supreme Soviet

First secretaries of the Moldavian Communist Party
Piotr Borodin (2 August 1940 – 11 February 1942) 
Nikita Salogor (13 February 1942 – 5 January 1946)  (acting)
Nicolae Coval (5 January 1946 – 26 July 1950)
Leonid Brezhnev (26 July 1950 – 25 October 1952)
Dimitri Gladki (25 October 1952 – 8 February 1954)
Zinovie Serdiuk (8 February 1954 – 29 May 1961)
Ivan Bodiul (29 May 1961 – 22 December 1980)
Semion Grossu (22 December 1980 – 16 December 1989)
Petru Lucinschi (16 November 1989 – 5 February 1991)
Grigore Eremei (5 February – 23 August 1991)

Chairman of the Supreme Soviet
 Party

Republic of Moldova (1991–present) 

 Parties

 Status

Residence

The Presidential Palace is located in the Buiucani sector of Chișinău. It was constructed between 1984 and 1987 to the design of architects A. Zalțman and V. Iavorski. The distinctive building was originally the meeting place of the Supreme Soviet of the Moldavian SSR.

See also
President of Transnistria

References

External links

Official website of the President of Moldova
Official Youtube website of the President of Moldova

 

 
Lists of Moldovan politicians
m
1990 establishments in the Moldavian Soviet Socialist Republic